William Swanson (30 May 1819 – 23 April 1903) was a 19th-century Member of Parliament in Auckland, New Zealand. An early pioneer of the Auckland Region, Swanson logged kauri on the banks of the Swanson Stream in the 1850s.

Biography 

Swanson was born on 30 May 1819 in Leith, Scotland. He was orphaned as a boy, and was raised by his uncle and later his paternal grandparents. He started his career in Greenock, working as a shipwright's apprentice. In 1844 he moved to Auckland, working on constructing a barque on Great Barrier Island, repairing ships in Auckland, and collected oyster shells, to be used for lime to construct the walls of the Albert Barracks. He lived on West Queen Street with his defacto wife Mere Ngaoko, and their two children. West Queen Street later became known as Swanson Street, due to its association with him. 

In 1849, Swanson left New Zealand for the California Gold Rush. During this time, Ngaoko, believing that her husband was dead, relocated to the Waikato with their two sons. She had a third son while living there, dying soon afterwards. Swanson returned to New Zealand in 1852, bringing his sons back to Auckland to live with him. Swanson would buy land in West Auckland from the New Zealand government, settling on the banks of the Swanson Stream, where he logged kauri until 1861. He married again twice: once to Timata Titoki in 1853, and again in 1855 to Ani Rangitunoa. Swanson's son with Titoki, George Swanson, was one of the first students to attend the Auckland Grammar School.  Ani Rangitunoa was a woman of high birth from the Ngāti Te Whatuiāpiti hapū, who was from the Hawke's Bay. 

Swanson began a political career in 1863, first by representing the West Ward on the Auckland City Board. He represented the Newton electorate from 1871 to 1884, when he retired. He was a minister in the Vogel Ministry, 1876 and Grey Ministry 1877–1879 as a Member of the Executive Council. He was then appointed to the Legislative Council in 1885, a position he held until his death.

In the 1870s he won a bet with John Sangster Macfarlane who had claimed that a certain politician would soon be in Mt Eden (gaol), and used to display the cheque for £80 which he received from Macfarlane but did not cash.

In 1903, he died of a heart failure. By the time if his death, Swanson had eight children, of whom seven survived and six married. Swanson is the namesake of the Swanson Stream, Swanson Street in the Auckland city centre, and the suburb of Swanson in West Auckland.

References

Bibliography

1819 births
1903 deaths
19th-century Scottish businesspeople
19th-century Scottish politicians
19th-century New Zealand businesspeople
19th-century New Zealand politicians
Members of the New Zealand House of Representatives
Members of the Cabinet of New Zealand
Members of the New Zealand Legislative Council
Members of the New Zealand Legislative Council (1841–1853)
New Zealand MPs for Auckland electorates
People from Leith
Scottish emigrants to New Zealand
Unsuccessful candidates in the 1884 New Zealand general election